Paraguraleus is a genus of sea snails, marine gastropod mollusks in the family Mangeliidae.

This genus was originally described by A.W.B. Powell as belonging to the group of Lower Miocene to Recent Australian turrids, resembling Guraleus but with a very different protoconch.

Species
  † Paraguraleus balcombensis (Powell, 1944)
 Paraguraleus emina (Hedley, 1905)
 Paraguraleus lucidus Laseron, 1954
Species brought into synonymy
 Paraguraleus alternatus Laseron, 1954: synonym of Antiguraleus alternatus (Laseron, 1954)
 Paraguraleus costatus (Hedley, 1922): synonym of Antiguraleus costatus (Hedley, 1922)
 Paraguraleus howelli Laseron, 1954: synonym of Antiguraleus howelli (Laseron, 1954) 
 Paraguraleus permutatus (Hedley, 1922): synonym of Antiguraleus permutatus (Hedley, 1922)
 Paraguraleus serpentis Laseron, 1954: synonym of Antiguraleus serpentis (Laseron, 1954)
 Paraguraleus subitus Laseron, 1954: synonym of Antiguraleus subitus (Laseron, 1954) 
 Paraguraleus tepidus Laseron, 1954: synonym of Antiguraleus tepidus (Laseron, 1954)

References

External links
 
 Worldwide Mollusc Species Data Base: Mangeliidae
 Bouchet, P.; Kantor, Y. I.; Sysoev, A.; Puillandre, N. (2011). A new operational classification of the Conoidea (Gastropoda). Journal of Molluscan Studies. 77(3): 273-308